The Dresden Conference (December 23, 1850 to May 16, 1851) took place at Dresden, Kingdom of Saxony, after the Prussian humiliation at the Punctation of Olmütz. It was a largely fruitless exercise to settle the constitutional problems of Germany, but reaffirmed Prussian recognition of the German Confederation and resulted in Prussia signing a secret alliance with the Austrian Empire to assist each other in case of attacks on the German Confederation or either of their empires.

References 

1851 treaties
Treaties of the Austrian Empire
Treaties of the Kingdom of Prussia
1851 in Prussia
1851 in Germany
Austria–Prussia relations
1851 conferences